The following is a timeline of the history of the city of Aachen, Germany.

Prior to 14th century
 451 – Town "pillaged by the Huns."
 786 – Palace of Charlemagne construction begins.
 796 – Palatine Chapel construction begins (approximate date).
 799 –  (militia) formed.
 813 – 13 September: Coronation of Louis the Pious as King of the Franks.
 814 – 28 January: Death of Charlemagne.
 816 – Catholic Council of Aachen establishes the Rule of Aix.
 936 – 7 August: Coronation of King of Germany Otto I in Aachen Cathedral.
 961 – Coronation of Otto II.
 983
 Coronation of Otto III as King of Germany.
 Chapel rebuilt.
 1028 – Coronation of Henry III as King of Germany.
 1054 – Coronation of Henry IV
 1087 – Coronation of Conrad II.
 1099 – Coronation of Henry V as King of Germany.
 1125 – Coronation of Lothair II as King of the Romans.
 1138 – Coronation of Conrad III as King of the Romans.
 1147 – Coronation of Henry Berengar as King of Germany.
 1152 – Coronation of Frederick I as King of the Romans.
 1169 – Coronation of Henry VI as King of the Romans.
 1198 – Coronation of Otto IV.
 1205 – Coronation of Philip of Swabia.
 1215
 Coronation of Frederick II.
 Karlsschrein (shrine of Charlemagne) built in cathedral.
 1222 – Coronation of Henry as German King.
 1248 – Siege of Aachen; followed by coronation of William II of Holland.
 1257 – Coronation of Richard as King of the Romans.
 1273 – Coronation of Rudolph I.
 1292 – Coronation of Adolf, King of Germany.
 1298 – Coronation of Albert I.
late 13th century – Ponttor (city gate) built, first mentioned in 1320.
 1300 –  (gate) built (approximate date).

14th–18th centuries

 1306 – Aachen becomes a Free Imperial City of the Holy Roman Empire.
 1309 – Coronation of Henry VII as King of the Romans.
 1314 – Coronation of Louis IV as King of the Romans.
 1349 – Coronation of Charles IV as King of the Romans.
 1353 – Aachen Town Hall built.
 1376 – Coronation of Wenceslaus IV as King of Germany.
 1414 – Coronation of Sigismund as King of the Romans.
 1442 – Coronation of Frederick III as King of the Romans.
 1486 – Coronation of Maximilian I as King of the Romans.
 1520 – Coronation of Charles V as King of Germany.
 1531 – Coronation of Ferdinand I as King of Germany.
 1580 – Protestant Reformation (approximate date).
 1601 – Population: 14,171.

 1614 – August: Siege of Aachen.
 1656 – Fire.
 1668 – May: Town hosts signing of the Treaty of Aix-la-Chapelle (1668).
 1748 – April: Town hosts international Congress of Aix-la-Chapelle and signing of treaty.
 1787 –  active.
 1794 – Town occupied by French forces.
 1795 – Population: 23,413.

19th century
 1801
 Town becomes part of France, per Peace of Lunéville.
 Roman Catholic Diocese of Aachen established.
 1815 – Town becomes part of the Kingdom of Prussia, per Congress of Vienna.
 1817
  (bookseller) in business.
 Population: 32,300.
 1818 – October: Town hosts international Congress of Aix-la-Chapelle.
 1825
 Theater Aachen opens.
 Lower Rhenish Music Festival held.
 1834 – Lower Rhenish Music Festival held; performers include Frédéric Chopin.
 1840 – Population: 44,289.
 1841 – Cologne-Aachen railway begins operating.
 1846 – Lower Rhenish Music Festival held, directed by Felix Mendelssohn; performers include Jenny Lind.

 1849 – Reuters news agency in business.
 1853 – Aachen–Mönchengladbach railway begins operating.
 1857 – Lower Rhenish Music Festival held, directed by Franz Liszt.
 1859 – Church of Our Lady built.
 1867 – Population: 67,923.
 1870 – Polytechnikum (school) opens.
 1880 – Tram begins operating.
 1885
  (history association) founded.
 Population: 95,321.
 1888 – Church of St. James built.
 1890 – Population: 103,470.
 1895 – Electric tram begins operating.
 1897 – Burtscheid becomes part of Aachen.
 1900 – Alemannia Aachen football club formed.

20th century

 1905 – Aachen Hauptbahnhof (railway station) opens.
 1908 – Jünglingverein Sankt Jakob Aachen (sport club) formed.
 1919 – Population: 145,748.
 1923 – October: Rhenish Republic established.
 1924 – Rhenish Republic ends.
 1928 – Tivoli stadium opens.
 1942 – Forced labour camp established in the Burtscheid district.
 1944
 April: Forced labour camp moved from Burtscheid to the Steinebrück district.
 May: Forced labour camp in Steinebrück dissolved.
 October: Battle of Aachen. Americans capture city.
 1949 – Aachen I parliamentary district created.
 1950 – Zimmertheater Aachen founded.
 1951 – Theater Aachen rebuilt.
 1954 – Elysee Theatre re-opens.
 1956 – Belvedere Water Tower built.
 1959 – Scotch-Club opens.
 1960 –  (zoo) established.
 1961 – Museum established in Frankenberg Castle.
 1965 –  founded.
 1968 –  built.
 1970 – July: Aachen Open Air Pop Festival held.
 1971
 Aachen University of Applied Sciences established.
 Population: 176,626.
 1972
 Brand becomes part of Aachen.
 Kurt Malangré becomes mayor.
 Population: 238,570.
 1980 – Rugby Club Aachen formed.
 1985 – Klinikum Aachen opens.
 1986
 First independent Theatre (Theater 99) opens
  (art nonprofit) founded.
 1989 – Jürgen Linden becomes mayor.
 2000 – Karlsgarten (garden) opens.

21st century

 2003 – Cologne–Aachen high-speed railway in operation.
 2006 – Host of World Equestrian Games.
 2009
 New Tivoli stadium opens.
  becomes mayor.
 City becomes part of Städteregion Aachen.
 2012 – Population: 240,086.
 2015 – City hosts the 2015 European Dressage Championships.
 2019 – Treaty on Franco-German Cooperation and Integration signed by French president Macron and German Federal Chancellor Merkel.
 2020 – Sibylle Keupen becomes first female mayor.

See also
 Aachen history
 List of mayors of Aachen
 
 Timelines of other cities in the state of North Rhine-Westphalia:(de) Bonn, Cologne, Dortmund, Duisburg, Düsseldorf, Essen, Münster

References

This article incorporates information from the Dutch Wikipedia and German Wikipedia.

Bibliography

in English
published in the 18th-19th centuries
 
 
 
 
 
 
 
 
 
 
 

published in the 20th century

in German
 
 . Circa 1647/1660
 Christian Quix. Beiträge zur Geschichte der Stadt Aachen und ihrer Umgebungen. Mit 14 Urkunden, Dritter Band, Jacob Anton Mayer, 1838.
  (bibliography)
 
 Hugo Loersch. Aachener Rechtsdenkmäler aus dem 13., 14. und 15. Jahrhundert. Bonn 1871.
 Friedrich Haagen. Geschichte Achens von seinen Anfängen bis zur neuesten Zeit. Band 2: Vom Jahre 1400–1865. Aachen 1874. 
 
 
 
 Max Wohlhage: Aachen im Dreissigjährigen Kriege Aachen 1911.

External links
 Europeana. Items related to Aachen, various dates

Years in Germany
 
Aachen
aachen